Clarke County School District  is a school district in Clarke County, Alabama.

External links
 

School districts in Alabama